Mary's Corner is an unincorporated community located in Lewis County, Washington. The area sits at the crossroads of U.S. Route 12 and Jackson Highway (once the Pacific and National Parks Highway intersection). The community is 11.2 miles south of Chehalis and 4.2 miles west of the town of Ethel. The  Lewis and Clark State Park is directly south of the community. The John R. Jackson House, listed on the National Register of Historic Places and protected as a state park, is located in the town.

The name is taken from Mary Loftis, an owner of a restaurant located in the area beginning in the late 1880s. The area's first non-Native settler, John R. Jackson, set up the first county seat in his log cabin in 1851, also becoming the first federal court in the newly formed Washington Territory in 1854. The town, referred to at the time as the Highlands, would remain the county seat until it was moved to Claquato in 1858.

Notes

References

Populated places in Lewis County, Washington
Unincorporated communities in Lewis County, Washington
Unincorporated communities in Washington (state)